Proxima Centauri c (also called Proxima c or Alpha Centauri Cc) is a controversial exoplanet candidate claimed to be orbiting the red dwarf star Proxima Centauri, which is the closest star to the Sun and part of a triple star system.

Proxima Centauri c is a super-Earth or mini-Neptune about 7 times as massive as Earth, orbiting at roughly  every . The planet is not transiting its parent star from the point of view of an Earth-based observer.

The planet was first reported by Italian astrophysicist Mario Damasso and his colleagues in April 2019. Damasso's team had noticed minor movements of Proxima Centauri in the radial velocity data from the ESO's HARPS instrument, indicating a possible second planet orbiting Proxima Centauri. The discovery was published in January 2020. Also in June 2020, a possible directly imaged counterpart of Proxima c was detected in the infrared with SPHERE, but the authors admit that they "did not obtain a clear detection". If their candidate source is in fact Proxima Centauri c, it is too bright for a planet of its mass and age, implying that the planet may have a ring system with a radius of around 5 .

However, a 2022 study questioned the planetary nature of the observed radial velocity signal corresponding to Proxima c, attributing it to systematic effects. If this is the case, it is unclear why astrometric observations detected what appeared to be a similar planetary signature.

See also
 List of largest exoplanets
 List of nearest exoplanets

References

Exoplanets discovered in 2020
Exoplanets detected by radial velocity
Exoplanets detected by astrometry
Proxima Centauri
Planetary rings
Exoplanet candidates